Baqerabad-e Samaleh (also Romanized as Bāqerābād-e Sāmaleh; also known as Bāqerābād) is a village in Kivanat Rural District, Kolyai District, Sonqor County, Kermanshah Province, Iran. At the 2006 census, its population was 134, in 31 families.

References 

Populated places in Sonqor County